A list of films produced in France in 1976.

See also
1976 in France
1976 in French television

Notes

External links
 French films of 1976 at the Internet Movie Database
French films of 1976 at Cinema-francais.fr

1976
Films
French